Nike Oshinowo (born Adenike Asabi Oshinowo, 1966) is a Nigerian talk show host, entrepreneur, former pageant director and style icon.

Early life and pageants
Oshinowo was raised in Ibadan and England, where she attended boarding school. Although she had intended to become an air hostess or a doctor, she studied Politics at the University of Essex. Shortly after obtaining her degree, Oshinowo, mentored by former Miss Nigeria Helen Prest, represented Rivers at the Most Beautiful Girl in Nigeria pageant  and became its first Yoruba winner (She was crowned in 1990, but reigned through 1991). Her victory attracted controversy from the audience and showbiz journalists following rumours the contest was rigged in her favor. Towards the end of her reign Oshinowo, in an interview with a soft-sell magazine, denied Prest had a hand in her MBGN victory.

In 1991, Oshinowo, then representing Nigeria at Miss World, criticised her South African counterpart, Diana Tilden-Davis, after the latter reportedly made derogatory remarks regarding black women. According to The Sowetan, Tilden-Davis had stated no blacks competed in Miss South Africa due to a high rate in teen pregnancy, but Miss World officials banned Tilden-Davis, who subsequently placed third in the contest that year, from arguing against the accusation, dismissing the report as a rumour.

Career
After her reign, Oshinowo featured in a commercial for the Venus de Milo beauty range, and hosted a fashion and beauty show on Nigerian television. Her business ventures included African food delivery service Buka Express, and health and beauty day spa Skin Deep  which ran for seven years before it was sold after she decided to create her own range of beauty products for the Nigerian market. On January 17, 2010, she released the workout video Nike Oshinowo: Fit, Forty and Fabulous - the first celebrity fitness DVD produced in the country - and launched her own fragrance Asabi.

In 2010, after a six-year attempt, Oshinowo finally bought the Miss Nigeria franchise from former organisers Daily Times, and became chief executive and creative director of the pageant. As of 2012, she is no longer in charge, but is now working on another pageant in which the winner will reign for a hundred years.

In 2014, Oshinowo launched her talk show Late Night with Nike Oshinowo on AIT.

Personal life
Oshinowo, who speaks five languages (English, French, Japanese, Spanish, and her native Yoruba), married medical doctor Tunde Soleye in 2006, but is now divorced. In 2009, the couple were in the news following a lawsuit instituted by Soleye's ex-wife Funmilayo, who claimed that he had been unfaithful with Oshinowo during their marriage. In 2013, she spoke of her struggle with endometriosis which has plagued her since boarding school by age 13, and at the age of 47 she became the mother of twins via surrogacy in America.

References

External links 

Most Beautiful Girl in Nigeria winners
Miss World 1991 delegates
1968 births
Living people
Yoruba beauty pageant contestants
Alumni of the University of Essex
Nigerian socialites
Businesspeople from Ibadan
20th-century Nigerian businesswomen
20th-century Nigerian businesspeople
Yoruba women in business
21st-century Nigerian businesswomen
21st-century Nigerian businesspeople
Nigerian beauty pageant contestants
Nigerian television talk show hosts
Yoruba women television personalities
Nigerian restaurateurs
Television personalities from Ibadan
Most Beautiful Girl in Nigeria contestants